Magnesium transporters are proteins that transport magnesium across the cell membrane. All forms of life require magnesium, yet the molecular mechanisms of Mg2+ uptake from the environment and the distribution of this vital element within the organism are only slowly being elucidated.

The ATPase function of MgtA is highly cardiolipin dependent and has been shown to detect free magnesium in the μM range 

In bacteria, Mg2+ is probably mainly supplied by the CorA protein and, where the CorA protein is absent, by the MgtE protein. In yeast the initial uptake is via the Alr1p and Alr2p proteins, but at this stage the only internal Mg2+ distributing protein identified is Mrs2p. Within the protozoa only one Mg2+ transporter (XntAp) has been identified. In metazoa, Mrs2p and MgtE homologues have been identified, along with two novel Mg2+ transport systems TRPM6/TRPM7 and PCLN-1. Finally, in plants, a family of Mrs2p homologues has been identified along with another novel protein, AtMHX.

Evolution 

The evolution of Mg2+ transport appears to have been rather complicated. Proteins apparently based on MgtE are present in bacteria and metazoa, but are missing in fungi and plants, whilst proteins apparently related to CorA are present in all of these groups. The two active transport transporters present in bacteria, MgtA and MgtB, do not appear to have any homologies in higher organisms. There are also Mg2+ transport systems that are found only in the higher organisms.

Types 

There are a large number of proteins yet to be identified that transport Mg2+. Even in the best studied eukaryote, yeast, Borrelly has reported a Mg2+/H+ exchanger without an associated protein, which is probably localised to the Golgi. At least one other major Mg2+ transporter in yeast is still unaccounted for, the one affecting Mg2+ transport in and out of the yeast vacuole. In higher, multicellular organisms, it seems that many Mg2+ transporting proteins await discovery.

The CorA-domain-containing Mg2+ transporters (CorA, Alr-like and Mrs2-like) have a similar but not identical array of affinities for divalent cations. In fact, this observation can be extended to all of the Mg2+ transporters identified so far. This similarity suggests that the basic properties of Mg2+ strongly influence the possible mechanisms of recognition and transport. However, this observation also suggests that using other metal ions as tracers for Mg2+ uptake will not necessarily produce results comparable to the transporter's ability to transport Mg2+. Ideally, Mg2+ should be measured directly.

Since 28Mg2+ is practically unobtainable, much of the old data will need to be reinterpreted with new tools for measuring Mg2+ transport, if different transporters are to be compared directly. The pioneering work of Kolisek and Froschauer using mag-fura 2 has shown that free Mg2+ can be reliably measured in vivo in some systems. By returning to the analysis of CorA with this new tool, we have gained an important baseline for the analysis of new Mg2+ transport systems as they are discovered. However, it is important that the amount of transporter present in the membrane is accurately determined if comparisons of transport capability are to be made. This bacterial system might also be able to provide some utility for the analysis of eukaryotic Mg2+ transport proteins, but differences in biological systems of prokaryotes and eukaryotes will have to be considered in any experiment.

Function 

Comparing the functions of the characterised Mg2+ transport proteins is currently almost impossible, even though the proteins have been investigated in different biological systems using different methodologies and technologies. Finding a system where all the proteins can be compared directly would be a major advance. If the proteins could be shown to be functional in bacteria (S. typhimurium), then a combination of the techniques of mag-fura 2, quantification of protein in the envelope membrane, and structure of the proteins (X-ray crystal or cryo-TEM) might allow the determination of the basic mechanisms involved in the recognition and transport of the Mg2+ ion. However, perhaps the best advance would be the development of methods allowing the measurement of the protein's function in the patch-clamp system using artificial membranes.

Bacteria

Early research
In 1968, Lusk described the limitation of bacterial (Escherichia coli) growth on Mg2+-poor media, suggesting that bacteria required Mg2+ and were likely to actively take this ion from the environment. The following year, the same group and another group, Silver, independently described the uptake and efflux of Mg2+ in metabolically active E. coli cells using 28Mg2+. By the end of 1971, two papers had been published describing the interference of Co2+, Ni2+ and Mn2+ on the transport of Mg2+ in E. coli and in Aerobacter aerogenes and Bacillus megaterium. In the last major development before the cloning of the genes encoding the transporters, it was discovered that there was a second Mg2+ uptake system that showed similar affinity and transport kinetics to the first system, but had a different range of sensitivities to interfering cations. This system was also repressible by high extracellular concentrations of Mg2+
.

CorA

The CorA gene and its corresponding protein are the most exhaustively studied Mg2+ transport system in any organism. Most of the published literature on the CorA gene comes from the laboratory of M. E. Maguire. Recently the group of R. J. Schweyen made a significant impact on the understanding of Mg2+ transport by CorA. The gene was originally named after the cobalt-resistant phenotype in E. coli that was caused by the gene's inactivation.

The gene was genetically identified in E. coli by Park et al., but wasn't cloned until Hmiel et al. isolated the Salmonella enterica serovar Typhimurium (S. typhimurium) homologue. Later it would be shown by Smith and Maguire that the CorA gene was present in 17 gram-negative bacteria. With the large number of complete genome sequences now available for prokaryotes, CorA has been shown to be virtually ubiquitous among the Eubacteria, as well as being widely distributed among the Archaea. The CorA locus in E. coli contains a single open reading frame of 948 nucleotides, producing a protein of 316 amino acids. This protein is well conserved amongst the Eubacteria and Archaea. Between E. coli and S. typhimurium, the proteins are 98% identical, but in more distantly related species, the similarity falls to between 15 and 20%. In the more distantly related genes, the similarity is often restricted to the C-terminal part of the protein, and a short amino acid motif GMN within this region is very highly conserved. The CorA domain, also known as PF01544 in the pFAM conserved protein domain database (http://webarchive.loc.gov/all/20110506030957/http%3A//pfam.sanger.ac.uk/), is additionally present in a wide range of higher organisms, and these transporters will be reviewed below.

The CorA gene is constitutively expressed in S. typhimurium under a wide range of external Mg2+ concentrations. However, recent evidence suggests that the activity of the protein may be regulated by the PhoPQ two-component regulatory system. This sensor responds to low external Mg2+ concentrations during the infection process of S. typhimurium in humans. In low external Mg2+ conditions, the PhoPQ system was reported to suppress the function of CorA and it has been previously shown that the transcription of the alternative Mg2+ transporters MgtA and MgtB is activated in these conditions. Chamnongpol and Groisman suggest that this allows the bacteria to escape metal ion toxicity caused by the transport of other ions, particularly Fe(II), by CorA in the absence of Mg2+. Papp and Maguire offer a conflicting report on the source of the toxicity.

The figure (not to scale) shows the originally published transmembrane (TM) domain topology of the S. typhimurium CorA protein, which was said to have three membrane-spanning regions in the C-terminal part of the protein (shown in blue), as determined by Smith et al.. Evidence for CorA acting as a homotetramer was published by Warren et al. in 2004. In December 2005 the crystal structure of the CorA channel was posted to the RSCB protein structure database. The results showed that the protein has two TM domains and exists as a homopentamer, in direct conflict with the earlier reports. Follow this link to see the structure in 3D. The soluble intracellular parts of the protein are highly charged, containing 31 positively charged and 53 negatively charged residues. Conversely, the TM domains contain only one charged amino acid, which has been shown to be unimportant in the activity of the transporter. From mutagenesis experiments, it appears that the chemistry of the Mg2+ transport relies on the hydroxyl groups lining the inside of the transport pore; there is also an absolute requirement for the GMN motif (shown in red).

Before the activity of CorA could be studied in vivo, any other Mg2+ transport systems in the bacterial host had to be identified and inactivated or deleted (see below). A strain of S. typhimurium containing a functional CorA gene but lacking MgtA and MgtB was constructed(also see below), and the uptake kinetics of the transporter were analysed. This strain showed nearly normal growth rates on standard media (50 μM Mg2+), but the removal of all three genes created a bacterial strain requiring 100 mM external Mg2+ for normal growth.

Mg2+ is transported into cells containing only the CorA transport system with similar kinetics and cation sensitivities as the Mg2+ uptake described in the earlier papers, and has additionally been quantified(see table). The uptake of Mg2+ was seen to plateau as in earlier studies, and although no actual mechanism for the decrease in transport has been determined, so it has been assumed that the protein is inactivated. Co2+ and Ni2+ are toxic to S. typhimurium cells containing a functional CorA protein and this toxicity stems from the blocking of Mg2+ uptake (competitive inhibition) and the accumulation of these ions inside the cell. Co2+ and Ni2+ have been shown to be transported by CorA by using radioactive tracer analysis, although with lower affinities (km) and velocities (Vmax) than for Mg2+ (see table). The km values for Co2+ and Ni2+ are significantly above those expected to be encountered by the cells in their normal environment, so it is unlikely that the CorA transport system mediates the uptake of these ions under natural conditions. To date, the evidence for Mn2+ transport by CorA is limited to E. coli.

The table lists the transport kinetics of the CorA Mg2+ transport system. This table has been compiled from the publications of Snavely et al. (1989b), Gibson et al. (1991) and Smith et al. (1998a) and summarises the kinetic data for the CorA transport protein expressed from the wild type promoter in bacteria lacking MgtA and MgtB. km and Vmax were determined at 20 °C as the uptake of Mg2+ at 37 °C was too rapid to measure accurately.

Recently the Mg2+-dependent fluorescence of mag-fura 2 was used to measure the free Mg2+ content of S. typhimurium cells in response to external Mg2+, which showed that CorA is the major uptake system for Mg2+ in bacteria. The authors also showed for the first time that the changes in the electric potential (ΔΨ) across the plasma membrane of the cell affected both the rate of Mg2+ uptake and the free Mg2+ content of the cell; depolarisation suppressed transport, while hyperpolarisation increased transport. The kinetics of transport were defined only by the rate of change of free Mg2+ inside the cells (250 μM s−1). Because no quantification of the amount of CorA protein in the membrane was made, this value cannot be compared with other experiments on Mg2+ transporters.

The efflux of Mg2+ from bacterial cells was first observed by Lusk and Kennedy (1969) and is mediated by the CorA Mg2+ transport system in the presence of high extracellular concentrations of Mg2+. The efflux can also be triggered by Co2+, Mn2+ and Ni2+, although not to the same degree as Mg2+. No Co2+ efflux through the CorA transport system was observed. The process of Mg2+ efflux additionally requires one of the CorB, CorC or CorD genes. The mutation of any single one of these genes leads to a Co2+ resistance a little less than half of that provided by a CorA mutant. This effect may be due to the inhibition of Mg2+ loss that would otherwise occur in the presence of high levels of Co2+. It is currently unknown whether Mg2+ is more toxic when the CorBCD genes are deleted.

It has been speculated that the Mg2+ ion will initially interact with any transport protein through its hydration shell. Cobalt (III) hexaammine, Co(III)Hex, is a covalently bound (non-labile) analog for the first shell of hydration for several divalent cations, including Mg2+. The radius of the Co(III)Hex molecule is 244 pm, very similar to the 250 pm radius of the first hydration shell of Mg2+. This analog is a potent inhibitor of the CorA transport system, more so than Mg2+, Co2+ or Ni2+. The additional strength of the Co(III)Hex inhibition might come from the blocking of the transport pore due to the inability of the protein to ‘dehydrate’ the substrate. It was also shown that Co(III)Hex was not transported into the cells, suggesting that at least partial dehydration would be required for the transport of the normal substrate (Mg2+). Nickel (II) hexaammine, with a radius of 255 pm, did not inhibit the CorA transport system, suggesting a maximum size limit exists for the binding of the CorA substrate ion. These results suggest that the important property involved in the recognition of Mg2+ by CorA is the size of the ion with its first shell of hydration. Hence, the volume change generally quoted for the bare to hydrated Mg2+ ion of greater than 500-fold, including the second sphere of hydration, may not be biologically relevant, and may be a reason for the first sphere volume change of 56-fold to be more commonly used.

MgtA and MgtB
The presence of these two genes was first suspected when Nelson and Kennedy (1972) showed that there were Mg2+-repressible and non-repressible Mg2+ uptake systems in E. coli. The non-repressible uptake of Mg2+ is mediated by the CorA protein. In S. typhimurium the repressible Mg2+ uptake was eventually shown to be via the MgtA and MgtB proteins.

Both MgtA and MgtB are regulated by the PhoPQ system and are actively transcribed during the process of infection of human patients by S. typhimurium. Although neither gene is required for pathogenicity, the MgtB protein does enhance the long-term survival of the pathogen in the cell. The genes are also upregulated in vitro when the Mg2+ concentration falls below 50 μM (Snavely et al., 1991a). Although the proteins have km values similar to CorA and transport rates approximately 10 times less, the genes may be part of a Mg2+ scavenging system. Chamnongpol and Groisman (2002) presents evidence that the role of these proteins may be to compensate for the inactivation of the CorA protein by the PhoPQ regulon. The authors suggest that the CorA protein is inactivated to allow the avoidance of metal toxicity via the protein in the low Mg2+ environments S. typhimurium is subjected to by cells after infection.

The proteins are both P-type ATPases
 and neither gene shows any similarity to CorA. The MgtA and MgtB proteins are 75% similar (50% identical), although it seems that MgtB may have been acquired by horizontal gene transfer as part of Salmonella Pathogenicity Island 3. The TM topology of the MgtB protein has been experimentally determined, showing that the protein has ten TM-spanning helices with the termini of the protein in the cytoplasm (see figure
). MgtA is present in widely divergent bacteria, but is not nearly as common as CorA, while MgtB appears to have a quite restricted distribution. No hypotheses for the unusual distribution have been suggested.

The figure, adapted from Smith et al. (1993b), shows the experimentally determined membrane topology of the MgtB protein in S. typhimurium. The TM domains are shown in light blue and the orientation in the membrane and the positions of the N- and C-termini are indicated. The figure is not drawn to scale.

While the MgtA and MgtB proteins are very similar, they do show some minor differences in activity. MgtB is very sensitive to temperature, losing all activity (with regard to Mg2+ transport) at a temperature of 20 °C. Additionally, MgtB and MgtA are inhibited by different ranges of cations (Table A10.1).

The table lists cation transport characteristics of the MgtA and MgtB proteins in S. typhimurium as well as the kinetic data for the MgtA and MgtB transport proteins at 37 °C. The Vmax numbers listed in parentheses are those for uptake at 20 °C. The inhibition of Mg2+ transport by Mn2+ via MgtA showed unusual kinetics (see Figure 1 of Snavely et al., 1989b)

The MgtA and MgtB proteins are ATPases, using one molecule of ATP per transport cycle, whereas the Mg2+ uptake via CorA is simply electrochemically favourable. Chamnongpol and Groisman (2002) have suggested that the MgtA and MgtB proteins form part of a metal toxicity avoidance system. Alternatively, as most P-type ATPases function as efflux mediating transporters, it has been suggested that the MgtA and MgtB proteins act as efflux proteins for a currently unidentified cation, and Mg2+ transport is either non-specific or exchanged to maintain the electro-neutrality of the transport process. Further experiments will be required to define the physiological function of these proteins.

MgtE

Two papers describe MgtE, a fourth Mg2+ uptake protein in bacteria unrelated to MgtA/B or CorA. This gene has been sequenced and the protein, 312 amino acids in size, is predicted to contain either four or five TM spanning domains that are closely arranged in the C-terminal part of the protein (see figure). This region of the protein has been identified in the Pfam database as a conserved protein domain (PF01769) and species containing proteins that have this protein domain are roughly equally distributed throughout the Eubacteria and Archaea, although it is quite rare in comparison with the distribution of CorA. However, the diversity of the proteins containing the domain is significantly larger than that of the CorA domain. The Pfam database lists seven distinct groups of MgtE domain containing proteins, of which six contain an archaic or eubacterial member. The expression of MgtE is frequently controlled by a conserved RNA structure, YkoK leader or M-box.

The figure (right), adapted from Smith et al. (1995) and the PFAM database entry, shows the computer-predicted membrane topology of the MgtE protein in Bacillus firmus OF4. The TM domains are shown in light blue. The CBS domains, named for the protein they were identified in, cystathionine-beta synthase, shown in orange, are identified in the Pfam database as regulatory domains, but the mechanism of action has not yet been described. They are found in several voltage-gated chloride channels. The orientation in the membrane and the positions of the N- and C-termini are indicated. This figure is not drawn to scale. This transporter has recently had its structure solved by x-ray crystallography.

The MgtE gene was first identified by Smith et al. (1995) during a screen for CorA-like proteins in bacteria and complements the Mg2+-uptake-deficient S. typhimurium strain MM281 (corA mgtA mgtB), restoring wild type growth on standard media. The kinetics of Mg2+ transport for the protein were not determined, as 28Mg2+ was unavailable. As a substitute, the uptake of 57Co2+ was measured and was shown to have a km of 82 μM and a Vmax of 354 pmol min−1 108 cells−1. Mg2+ was a competitive inhibitor with a Ki of 50 μM—the Ki of Mg2+ inhibition of 60Co2+ uptake via CorA is 10 μM. A comparison of the available kinetic data for MgtA and CorA is shown in the table. Clearly, MgtE does not transport Co2+ to the same degree as CorA, and the inhibition of transport by Mg2+ is also less efficient, which suggests that the affinity of MgtE for Mg2+ is lower than that of CorA. The strongest inhibitor of Co2+ uptake was Zn2+, with a Ki of 20 μM. The transport of Zn2+ by this protein may be as important as that of Mg2+.

The table shows a comparison of the transport kinetics of MgtE and CorA, and key kinetic parameter values for them are listed. As shown, the data has been generated at differing incubation temperatures. km and Ki are not significantly altered by the differing incubation temperature. Conversely, Vmax shows a strong positive correlation with temperature, hence the value of Co2+ Vmax for MgtE is not directly comparable with the values for CorA.

Yeast

Early research
The earliest research showing that yeast takes up Mg2+ appears to be done by Schmidt et al. (1949). However, these authors only showed altered yeast Mg2+ content in a table within the paper, and the report's conclusions dealt entirely with the metabolism of phosphate. A series of experiments by Rothstein shifted the focus more towards the uptake of the metal cations, showing that yeast take up cations with the following affinity series; Mg2+, Co2+, Zn2+ > Mn2+ > Ni2+ > Ca2+ > Sr2+. Additionally, it was suggested that the transport of the different cations is mediated by the same transport system — a situation very much like that in bacteria.

In 1998, MacDiarmid and Gardner finally identified the proteins responsible for the observed cation transport phenotype in Saccharomyces cerevisiae. The genes involved in this system and a second mitochondrial Mg2+ transport system, functionally identified significantly after the gene was cloned, are described in the sections below.

ALR1 and ALR2
Two genes, ALR1 and ALR2, were isolated in a screen for Al3+ tolerance (resistance) in yeast. Over-expression constructs containing yeast genomic DNA were introduced into wild type yeast and the transformants were screened for growth on toxic levels of Al3+. ALR1 and ALR2 containing plasmids allowed the growth of yeast in these conditions.

The Alr1p and Alr2p proteins consist of 859 and 858 amino acids respectively and are 70% identical. In a region in the C-terminal, half of these proteins are weakly similar to the full CorA protein. The computer-predicted TM topology of Alr1p is shown in the figure. The presence of a third TM domain was suggested by MacDiarmid and Gardner (1998), on the strength on sequence homology, and more recently by Lee and Gardner (2006), on the strength of mutagenesis studies, making the TM topology of these proteins more like that of CorA (see figure). Also, Alr1p contains the conserved GMN motif at the outside end of TM 2 (TM 2') and the mutation of the methionine (M) in this motif to a leucine (L) led to the loss of transport capability.

The figure shows the two possible TM topologies of Alr1p. Part A of the figure shows the computer-predicted membrane topology of the Alr1p protein in yeast and part B shows the topology of Alr1p based on the experimental results of Lee and Gardner (2006). The GMN motif location is indicated in red and the TM domains in light blue. The orientation in the membrane and the positions of the N- and C-termini are indicated, the various sizes of the soluble domains are given in amino acids (AA), and TM domains are numbered by their similarity to CorA. Where any TM domain is missing, the remaining domains are numbered with primes. The figure is not drawn to scale.
A third ALR-like gene is present in S. cerevisiae and there are two homologous genes in both Schizosaccharomyces pombe and Neurospora crassa. These proteins contain a GMN motif like that of CorA, with the exception of the second N. crassa gene. No ALR-like genes have been identified in species outside of the fungi.

Membrane fractionation and green fluorescent protein (GFP) fusion studies established that Alr1p is localised to the plasma membrane. The localisation of the Alr1p was observed to be internalised and degraded in the vacuole in response to extracellular cations. Mg2+, at very low extracellular concentrations (100 μM; < 10% of the standard media Mg2+ content), and Co2+ and Mn2+ at relatively high concentrations (> 20× standard media), induced the change in Alr1p protein localisation, and the effect was dependent on functional ubiquitination, endocytosis and vacuolar degradation. This mechanism was proposed to allow the regulation of Mg2+ uptake by yeast. 
However, a recent report  indicates that several of the observations made by Stadler et al. were not reproducible. For example, regulation of ALR1 mRNA accumulation by Mg2+ supply was not observed, and the stability of the Alr1 protein was not reduced by exposure to excess Mg2+. The original observation of Mg-dependent accumulation of the Alr1 protein under steady-state low-Mg conditions was replicated, but this effect was shown to be an artifact caused by the addition of a small peptide (epitope) to the protein to allow its detection. Despite these problems, Alr1 activity was demonstrated to respond to Mg supply, suggesting that the activity of the protein is regulated directly, as was observed for some bacterial CorA proteins.

A functional Alr1p (wild type) or Alr2p (overexpressed) is required for S. cerevisiae growth in standard conditions (4 mM Mg2+), and Alr1p can support normal growth at Mg2+ concentrations as low as 30 μM. 57Co2+ is taken up into yeast via the Alr1p protein with a km of 77 – 105 μM (C. MacDiarmid and R. C. Gardner, unpublished data), but the Ki for Mg2+ inhibition of this transport is currently unknown. The transport of other cations by the Alr1p protein was assayed by the inhibition of yeast growth. The overexpression of Alr1p led to increased sensitivity to Ca2+, Co2+, Cu2+, La3+, Mn2+, Ni2+ and Zn2+, an array of cations similar to those shown to be transported into yeast by a CorA-like transport system. The increased toxicity of the cations in the presence of the transporter is assumed to be due to the increased accumulation of the cation inside the cell.

The evidence that Alr1p is primarily a Mg2+ transporter is that the loss of Alr1p leads to a decreased total cell content of Mg2+, but not of other cations. Additionally, two electrophysiological studies where Alr1p was produced in yeast or Xenopus oocytes showed a Mg2+-dependent current in the presence of the protein; Salih et al., in prep.

The kinetics of Mg2+ uptake by Alr1p have been investigated by electrophysiology techniques on whole yeast cells. The results suggested that Alr1p is very likely to act as an ion-selective channel. In the same paper, the authors reported that Mg2+ transport by Alr1p varied from 200 pA to 1500 pA, with a mean current of 264 pA. No quantification of the amount of protein producing the current was presented, so the results lack comparability with the bacterial Mg2+ transport proteins.

The alternative techniques of 28Mg2+ radiotracer analysis and mag-fura 2 to measure Mg2+ uptake have not yet been used with Alr1p. 28Mg2+ is currently not available and the mag-fura 2 system is unlikely to provide simple uptake data in yeast. The yeast cell maintains a heterogeneous distribution of Mg2+ suggesting that multiple systems inside the yeast are transporting Mg2+ into storage compartments. This internal transport will very likely mask the uptake process. The expression of ALR1 in S. typhimurium without Mg2+ uptake genes may be an alternative, but, as stated earlier, the effects of a heterologous expression system would need to be taken into account.

MNR2
The MNR2 gene encodes a protein closely related to the Alr proteins, but includes conserved features that define a distinct subgroup of CorA proteins in fungal genomes, suggesting a distinct role in Mg2+ homeostasis. Like an alr1 mutant, growth of an mnr2 mutant was sensitive to Mg2+-deficient conditions, but the mnr2 mutant was observed to accumulate more Mg2+ than a wild-type strain under these conditions. These phenotypes suggested that Mnr2 may regulate Mg2+ storage within an intracellular compartment. Consistent with this interpretation, the Mnr2 protein was localized to the membrane of the vacuole, an internal compartment implicated in the storage of excess mineral nutrients by yeast. A direct role of Mnr2 in Mg2+ transport was suggested by the observation that increased Mnr2 expression, which redirected some Mnr2 protein to the cell surface, also suppressed the Mg2+-requirement of an alr1 alr2 double mutant strain. The mnr2 mutation also altered accumulation of other divalent cations, suggesting this mutation may increase Alr gene expression or protein activity. Recent work  supported this model, by showing that Alr1 activity was increased in an mnr2 mutant strain, and that the mutation was associated with induction of Alr1 activity at a higher external Mg concentration than was observed for an Mnr2 wild-type strain. These effects were observed without any change in Alr1 protein accumulation, again indicating that Alr1 activity may be regulated directly by the Mg concentration within the cell.

MRS2 and Lpe10
Like the ALR genes, the MRS2 gene was cloned and sequenced before it was identified as a Mg2+ transporter. The MRS2 gene was identified in the nuclear genome of yeast in a screen for suppressors of a mitochondrial gene RNA splicing mutation, and was cloned and sequenced by Wiesenberger et al. (1992). Mrs2p was not identified as a putative Mg2+ transporter until Bui et al. (1999). Gregan et al. (2001a) identified LPE10 by homology to MRS2 and showed that both LPE10 and MRS2 mutants altered the Mg2+ content of yeast mitochondria and affected RNA splicing activity in the organelle. Mg2+ transport has been shown to be directly mediated by Mrs2p, but not for Lpe10p.

The Mrs2p and Lpe10p proteins are 470 and 413 amino acid residues in size, respectively, and a 250–300 amino acid region in the middle of the proteins shows a weak similarity to the full CorA protein. The TM topologies of the Mrs2p and Lpe10p proteins have been assessed using a protease protection assay and are shown in the figure. TM 1 and 2 correspond to TM 2 and 3 in the CorA protein. The conserved GMN motif is at the outside end of the first TM domain, and when the glycine (G) in this motif was mutated to a cysteine (C) in Mrs2p, Mg2+ transport was strongly reduced.

The figure shows the experimentally determined topology of Mrs2p and Lpe10p as adapted from Bui et al. (1999) and Gregan et al. (2001a). The GMN motif location is indicated in red and the TM domains in light blue. The orientation in the membrane and the positions of the N- and C-termini are indicated. The various sizes of the soluble domains are given in amino acids (AA), TM domains are numbered, and the figure is not drawn to scale.

Mrs2p has been localised to the mitochondrial inner membrane by subcellular fractionation and immunodetection and Lpe10p to the mitochondria. Mitochondria lacking Mrs2p do not show a fast Mg2+ uptake, only a slow ‘leak’, and overaccumulation of Mrs2p leads to an increase in the initial rate of uptake. Additionally, CorA, when fused to the mitochondrial leader sequence of Mrs2p, can partially complement the mitochondrial defect conferred by the loss of either Mrs2p or Lpe10p. Hence, Mrs2p and/or Lpe10p may be the major Mg2+ uptake system for mitochondria. A possibility is that the proteins form heterodimers, as neither protein (when overexpressed) can fully complement the loss of the other.

The characteristics of Mg2+ uptake in isolated mitochondria by Mrs2p were quantified using mag-fura 2. The uptake of Mg2+ by Mrs2p shared a number of attributes with CorA. First, Mg2+ uptake was directly dependent on the electric potential (ΔΨ) across the boundary membrane. Second, the uptake is saturated far below that which the ΔΨ theoretically permits, so the transport of Mg2+ by Mrs2p is likely to be regulated in a similar manner to CorA, possibly by the inactivation of the protein. Third, Mg2+ efflux was observed via Mrs2p upon the artificial depolarisation of the mitochondrial membrane by valinomycin. Finally, the Mg2+ fluxes through Mrs2p are inhibited by cobalt (III) hexaammine.

The kinetics of Mg2+ uptake by Mrs2p were determined in the Froschauer et al. (2004) paper on CorA in bacteria. The initial change in free Mg2+ concentration was 150 μM s-1 for wild type and 750 μM s-1 for mitochondria from yeast overexpressing MRS2. No attempt was made to scale the observed transport to the amount of transporter present.

Protozoan (Paramecium)
The transport of Mg2+ into Paramecium has been characterised largely by R. R. Preston and his coworkers. Electrophysiological techniques on whole Paramecium were used to identify and characterise Mg2+ currents in a series of papers before the gene was cloned by Haynes et al. (2002).

The open reading frame for the XNTA gene is 1707 bp in size, contains two introns and produces a predicted protein of 550 amino acids. The protein has been predicted to contain 11 TM domains and also contains the α1 and α2 motifs (see figure) of the SLC8 (Na+/Ca2+ exchanger) and SLC24 (K+ dependent Na+/Ca2+ exchanger) human solute transport proteins. The XntAp is equally similar to the SLC8 and SLC24 protein families by amino acid sequence, but the predicted TM topology is more like that of SLC24, but the similarity is at best weak and the relationship is very distant. The AtMHX protein from plants also shares a distant relationship with the SLC8 proteins.

The figure shows the predicted TM topology of XntAp. Adapted from Haynes et al. (2002), this figure shows the computer predicted membrane topology of XntAp in Paramecium. The orientation in the membrane was determined using HMMTOP. The TM domains are shown in light blue, the α1 and α2 domains are shown in green. The orientation in the membrane and the positions of the N- and C-termini are indicated and the figure is not drawn to scale.

The Mg2+-dependent currents carried by XntAp are kinetically like that of a channel protein and have an ion selectivity order of Mg2+ > Co2+, Mn2+ > Ca2+ — a series again very similar to that of CorA. Unlike the other transport proteins reported so far, XntAp is dependent on intracellular Ca2+. The transport is also dependent on ΔΨ, but again Mg2+ is not transported to equilibrium, being limited to approximately 0.4 mM free Mg2+ in the cytoplasm. The existence of an intracellular compartment with a much higher free concentration of Mg2+ (8 mM) was supported by the results.

Animals
The investigation of Mg2+ in animals, including humans, has lagged behind that in bacteria and yeast. This is largely because of the complexity of the systems involved, but also because of the impression within the field that Mg2+ was maintained at high levels in all cells and was unchanged by external influences. Only in the last 25 years has a series of reports begun to challenge this view, with new methodologies finding that free Mg2+ content is maintained at levels where changes might influence cellular metabolism.

MRS2
A bioinformatic search of the sequence databases identified one homologue of the MRS2 gene of yeast in a range of metazoans. The protein has a very similar sequence and predicted TM topology to the yeast protein, and the GMN motif is intact at the end of the first TM domain. The human protein, hsaMrs2p, has been localised to the mitochondrial membrane in mouse cells using a GFP fusion protein.

Very little is known about the Mg2+ transport characteristics of the protein in mammals, but Zsurka et al. (2001) has shown that the human Mrs2p complements the mrs2 mutants in the yeast mitochondrial Mg2+ uptake system.

SLC41 (MgtE)
The identification of this gene family in the metazoa began with a signal sequence trap method for isolating secreted and membrane proteins. Much of the identification has come from bioinformatic analyses. Three genes were eventually identified in humans, another three in mouse and three in Caenorhabditis elegans, with a single gene in Anopheles gambiae. The pFAM database lists the MgtE domain as pFAM01769 and additionally identifies a MgtE domain-containing protein in Drosophila melanogaster. The proteins containing the MgtE domain can be divided into seven classes, as defined by pFAM using the type and organisation of the identifiable domains in each protein. Metazoan proteins are present in three of the seven groups. All of the metazoa proteins contain two MgtE domains, but some of these have been predicted only by context recognition (Coin, Bateman and Durbin, unpublished. See the pFAM website for further details).

The human SLC41A1 protein contains two MgtE domains with 52% and 46% respective similarity to the PF01769 consensus sequence and is predicted to contain ten TM domains, five in each MgtE domain (see figure), which suggests that the MgtE protein of bacteria may work as a dimer. 
Adapted from Wabakken et al. (2003) and the pFAM database, the figure shows the computer predicted membrane topology of MgtE in H. sapiens. The TM domains are shown in light blue, the orientation in the membrane and the positions of the N- and C-termini are indicated, and the figure is not drawn to scale.

Wabakken et al. (2003) found that the transcript of the SLC41A1 gene was expressed in all human tissues tested, but at varying levels, with the heart and testis having the highest expression of the gene. No explanation of the expression pattern has been suggested with regard to Mg2+-related physiology.

It has not been shown whether the SLC41 proteins transport Mg2+ or complement a Mg2+ transport mutation in any experimental system. However, it has been suggested that as MgtE proteins have no other known function, they are likely to be Mg2+ transporters in the metazoa as they are in the bacteria. This will need to be verified using one of the now standard experiment systems for examining Mg2+ transport.

TRPM6/ TRPM7
The investigation of the TRPM genes and proteins in human cells is an area of intense recent study and, at times, debate. Montell et al. (2002) have reviewed the research into the TRP genes, and a second review by Montell (2003) has reviewed the research into the TRPM genes.

The TRPM family of ion channels has members throughout the metazoa. The TRPM6 and TRPM7 proteins are highly unusual, containing both an ion channel domain and a kinase domain (Figure 1.7), the role of which brings about the most heated debate.

The activity of these two proteins has been very difficult to quantify. TRPM7 by itself appears to be a Ca2+ channel but in the presence of TRPM6 the affinity series of transported cations places Mg2+ above Ca2+. The differences in reported conductance were caused by the expression patterns of these genes. TRPM7 is expressed in all cell types tested so far, while TRPM6 shows a more restricted pattern of expression. An unfortunate choice of experimental system by Voets et al., (2004) led to the conclusion that TRPM6 is a functional Mg2+ transporter. However, later work by Chubanov et al. (2004) clearly showed that TRPM7 is required for TRPM6 activity and that the results of Voets et al. are explained by the expression of TRPM7 in the experimental cell line used by Voets et al. in their experiments. Whether TRPM6 is functional by itself is yet to be determined.

The predicted TM topology of the TPRM6 and TRPM7 proteins has been adapted from Nadler et al. (2001), Runnels et al. (2001) and Montell et al. (2002), this figure shows the computer predicted membrane topology of the TRPM6 and TRPM7 proteins in Homo sapiens. At this time, the topology shown should be considered a tentative hypothesis. The TM domains are shown in light blue, the pore loop in purple, the TRP motif in red and the kinase domain in green. The orientation in the membrane and the positions of the N- and C-termini are indicated and the figure is not drawn to scale.

The conclusions of the Voets et al. (2004) paper are probably incorrect in attributing the Mg2+ dependent currents to TRPM7 alone, and their kinetic data are likely to reflect the combined TRPM7/ TRPM6 channel. The report presents a robust collection of data consistent with a channel-like activity passing Mg2+, based on both electrophysiological techniques and also mag-fura 2 to determine changes in cytoplasmic free Mg2+.

Paracellular transport
Claudins allow for Mg2+ transport via the paracellular pathway; that is, it mediates the transport of the ion through the tight junctions between cells that form an epithelial cell layer. In particular, Claudin-16 allows the selective reuptake of Mg2+ in the human kidney. Some patients with mutations in the CLDN19 gene also have altered magnesium transport.

The gene Claudin-16 was cloned by Simon et al. (1999), but only after a series of reports described the Mg2+ flux itself with no gene or protein. The expression pattern of the gene was determined by RT-PCR, and was shown to be very tightly confined to a continuous region of the kidney tubule running from the medullary thick descending limb to the distal convoluted tubule. This localisation was consistent with the earlier reports for the location of Mg2+ re-uptake by the kidney. Following the cloning, mutations in the gene were identified in patients with familial hypomagnesaemia with hypercalciuria and nephrocalcinosis, strengthening the links between the gene and the uptake of Mg2+.

Plants
The current knowledge of the molecular mechanisms for Mg2+ transport in plants is very limited, with only three publications reporting a molecular basis for Mg2+ transport in plants. However, the importance of Mg2+ to plants has been well described, and physiological and ecophysiological studies about the effects of Mg2+ are numerous. This section will summarise the knowledge of a gene family identified in plants that is distantly related to CorA. Another gene, a Mg2+/H+ exchanger (AtMHX), unrelated to this gene family and to CorA has also been identified, is localised to the vacuolar membrane, and will be described last.

The AtMRS2 gene family
Schock et al. (2000) identified and named the family AtMRS2 based on the similarity of the genes to the MRS2 gene of yeast. The authors also showed that the AtMRS2-1 gene could complement a Δmrs2 yeast mutant phenotype. Independently, Li et al. (2001) published a report identifying the family and showing that two additional members could complement Mg2+ transport deficient mutants, one in S. typhimurium and the other in S. cerevisiae.

The three genes that have been shown to transport Mg2+ are AtMRS2-1, AtMRS2-10 and AtMRS2-11, and these genes produce proteins 442, 443 and 459 amino acids in size, respectively. Each of the proteins shows significant similarity to Mrs2p of yeast and a weak similarity to CorA of bacteria, contains the conserved GMN amino acid motif at the outside end of the first TM domain, and is predicted to have two TM domains.

The AtMRS2-1 gene, when expressed in yeast from the MRS2 promoter and being fused C-terminally to the first 95 amino acids of the Mrs2p protein, was directed to the mitochondria, where it complemented a Δmrs2 mutant both phenotypically (mitochondrial RNA splicing was restored) and with respect to the Mg2+ content of the organelle. No data on the kinetics of the transport was presented. The AtMRS2-11 gene was analysed in yeast (in the alr1 alr2 strain), where it was shown that expression of the gene significantly increased the rate of Mg2+ uptake into starved cells over the control, as measured using flame atomic absorption spectroscopy of total cellular Mg2+ content. However, Alr1p was shown to be significantly more effective at transporting Mg2+ at low extracellular concentrations, suggesting that the affinity of AtMRS2-11 for Mg2+ is lower than that of Alr1p. An electrophysiological (voltage clamp) analysis of the AtMRS2-11 protein in Xenopus oocytes also showed a Mg2+-dependent current at membrane potentials (ΔΨ) of –100 – –150 mV inside. These values are physiologically significant, as several membranes in plants maintain ΔΨ in this range. However, the author had difficulty reproducing these results due to an apparent "death" of oocytes containing the AtMRS2-11 protein, and therefore these results should be viewed with caution.

The AtMRS2-10 transporter has been analysed using radioactive tracer uptake analysis. 63Ni2+ was used as the substitute ion and Mg2+ was shown to inhibit the uptake of 63Ni2+ with a Ki of 20 μM. Uptake was also inhibited by Co(III)Hex and by other divalent cations. Only Co2+ and Cu2+ inhibited transport with Ki values less than 1 mM.

The AtMRS2-10 protein was fused to GFP, and was shown to be localised to the plasma membrane. A similar experiment was attempted in the Schock et al. (2000) paper, but the observed localisation was not significantly different from that seen with unfused GFP. The most likely reason for the lack of a definitive localisation of AtMRS2-1 in the Schock et al. paper is that the authors removed the TM domains from the protein, thereby precluding its insertion into a membrane.

The exact physiological significance of the AtMRS2-1 and AtMRS2-10 proteins in plants has yet to be clarified. The AtMRS2-11 gene has been overexpressed (from the CaMV 35S promoter) in A. thaliana. The transgenic line has been shown to accumulate high levels of the AtMRS2-11 transcript. A strong Mg2+ deficiency phenotype (necrotic spots on the leaves, see Chapter 1.5 below) was recorded during the screening process (in both the T1 and T2 generations) for a homozygote line, but this phenotype was lost in the T3 generation and could not be reproduced when the earlier generations were screened a second time. The author suggested that environmental effects were the most likely cause of the inconsistent phenotype.

AtMHX
The first magnesium transporter isolated in any multicellular organism, AtMHX shows no similarity to any previously isolated Mg2+ transport protein. The gene was initially identified in the A. thaliana genomic DNA sequence database, by its similarity to the SLC8 family of Na+/Ca2+ exchanger genes in humans.

The cDNA sequence of 1990 bp is predicted to produce a 539-amino acid protein. AtMHX is quite closely related to the SLC8 family at the amino acid level and shares a topology with eleven predicted TM domains (Figure A10.5). There is one major difference in the sequence, in that the long non-membranal loop (see Figure A10.5) is 148 amino acids in the AtMHX protein but 500 amino acids in the SLC8 proteins. However, this loop is not well conserved and is not required for transport function in the SLC8 family.

The AtMHX gene is expressed throughout the plant but most strongly in the vascular tissue. The authors suggest that the physiological role of the protein is to store Mg2+ in these tissues for later release when needed. The protein localisation to the vacuolar membrane supports this suggestion (see also Chapter 1.5).

The protein transports Mg2+ into the vacuolar space and H+ out, as demonstrated by electrophysiological techniques. The transport is driven by the ΔpH maintained between the vacuolar space (pH 4.5 – 5.9) and the cytoplasm (pH 7.3 – 7.6) by an H+-ATPase. How the transport of Mg2+ by the protein is regulated was not determined. Currents were observed to pass through the protein in both directions, but the Mg2+ out current required a ‘cytoplasmic’ pH of 5.5, a condition not found in plant cells under normal circumstances. In addition to the transport of Mg2+, Shaul et al. (1999) also showed that the protein could transport Zn2+ and Fe2+, but did not report on the capacity of the protein to transport other divalent cations (e.g. Co2+ and Ni2+) or its susceptibility to inhibition by cobalt (III) hexaammine.

The detailed kinetics of Mg2+ transport have not been determined for AtMHX. However, physiological effects have been demonstrated. When A. thaliana plants were transformed with overexpression constructs of the AtMHX gene driven by the CaMV 35S promoter, the plants over-accumulated the protein and showed a phenotype of necrotic lesions in the leaves, which the authors suggest is caused by a disruption in the normal function of the vacuole, given their observation that the total Mg2+ (or Zn2+) content of the plants was not altered in the transgenic plants.

 The image has been adapted from Shaul et al. (1999) and Quednau et al. (2004), and combined with an analysis using HMMTOP, this figure shows the computer predicted membrane topology of the AtMHX protein in Arabidopsis thaliana. At this time the topology shown should be considered a tentative hypothesis. The TM domains are shown in light blue, the orientation in the membrane and the positions of the N- and C-termini are indicated, and the figure is not drawn to scale. The α1 and α2 domains, shown in green, are both quite hydrophobic and may both be inserted into the membrane.

References 

Biology and pharmacology of chemical elements
Ion channels
Physiology
Magnesium
Membrane biology